A passenger bus fell into a ravine, nearly  high, in Carranglan, Nueva Ecija, the Philippines, killing 36 people and injuring about 40 others, after it lost its brakes near Dalton Pass on April 18, 2017. The accident surpassed the number of deaths in the bus crash in Tanay, Rizal this year which happened in February and killed 15.

Accident and investigation
According to Senior Supt. Antonio Yarra, director of the Nueva Ecija provincial police, the bus, a Leomarick bus bound from Isabela to Ilocos Sur, carried about 60 passengers (exceeding the total capacity of 45). As the bus reached Barangay Capintalan in Carranglan town, it lost its brakes, veered off the zigzag road, and plunged 24-30 m (80-100 ft) into a ravine. The resulting accident killed 36 passengers and injured around 46, who were mostly taken to the hospital.

Before the accident, the bus driver notified the passengers that the brakes were not working, according to the survivor via telephone interview with Yarra. Another survivor said the bus was trying to overtake another bus when its engine stopped; however, the bus lost control when the driver tried to restart the engine. Investigators said that the bus' front tires had popped, causing it to plunge. Authorities believe that the overloading of the bus is the possible cause of the crash; although it could only carry 45 passengers, there were 77 people on board.

Aftermath
The Land Transportation Franchising and Regulatory Board (LTFRB) will issue a 30-day suspension against the operator of Leomarick bus which involved in the accident. On the same day, at 3:55 pm, 26 bodies were retrieved by the provincial rescue team from the wreck site. It was confirmed that 13 victims who were retrieved from the wreck died.

LTFRB spokesperson Atty. Aileen Lizada said the agency will also distributing the P100,000 insurance to the victims.

Reaction
Malacañang Palace expressed condolences to the families of the victims of the bus crash.

References

Nueva Ecija bus accident
Nueva Ecija bus accident
Nueva Ecija bus accident
Bus incidents in the Philippines
History of Nueva Ecija